The South Downs Light Railway is a  gauge railway at Pulborough in West Sussex, England. The line opened in 2000 (after adjusting the gauge to 10 1/4 from 7 1/4 as there was a line there before the South Downs Light Railway arrived, and operates around the grounds of Pulborough Garden Centre, but now it is operating under British Garden Centres.

On a regular day one of their two Exmoor Steam Locomotives will be in-charge of the service. Their two Exmoor’s are named ‘Pulborough’ and ‘Peggy’. The railway hosts a range of scale locomotive which includes an LNER Flying Scotsman ,6100 royal Scot, 6220 coronation 

The railway has their own engine shed which has a workshop at the back of it. Just outside the engine shed there is a traverser to move the engine. There is also a drop-down pit so the engines can be inspected underneath. The old engine shed has now been converted to the railway's carriage shed. The railway has two stations, Stopham Road Station (where most people will start their journey) and Hardham Halt which is used during gala days and during Christmas as the North Pole.

2020 is the railway's 20th year of operating in its current location and they are hosting a 20th Gala Weekend which will most likely host visiting engines plus special attractions that are yet to be announced by the railway. The railway have announced that this gala weekend will happen in August.  The railway has developed a lot since they first opened including a new expansion, new engine shed, new workshop plus a new station (Hardham Halt).

Route
The railway has two stations: Stopham Road which is the main station, with passenger facilities including the ticket office; and Hardham Halt which is an intermediate station at which trains call during Christmas Services, galas, and other special events.

Locomotives
The three principal locomotives were all constructed for the line by Exmoor Steam Railway. All three are of the  wheel arrangement and built to narrow gauge outline proportions. They are:
Pulborough - 0-4-2 steam locomotive, built 2004, works number 319;
Peggy - 0-4-2 steam locomotive, built 2007, works number 334;
Arun - 0-4-2 diesel hydraulic, built 2016, works number 341.

Additionally, several scale-outline steam locomotives (including scale model LNER Flying Scotsman and LMS Mogul engines) are on-site, and may be seen in operation on busy days and for gala events.

Rolling stock
The railway hosts a range of passenger rolling stock and the railway hosts a scale freight train which can be seen during most of their events. Their passenger rolling stock consists of three different types of coaches. On a regular running day, the train usually consists of two open-top carriages, an open carriage and then, depending on the weather and the date, either a covered brake coach or an open-top brake coach. There is also an SR Brake Van that is used sometimes. Their scale freight train is seen during their gala days and is worth looking at.

External links
 website
 Archive of the South Downs Light Railway website

10¼ in gauge railways in England
Miniature railways in the United Kingdom
Rail transport in West Sussex